Zaduszniki  is a village in the administrative district of Gmina Padew Narodowa, within Mielec County, Subcarpathian Voivodeship, in south-eastern Poland.

The village has a population of 260.

Pharmacist and oil pioneer Ignacy Łukasiewicz (1822–1882) was born in Zaduszniki.

References

Zaduszniki